Belgian–Turkish relations are foreign relations between Belgium and Turkey. Belgium has an embassy in Ankara, a consulate–general in Istanbul and two consulates in Antalya and Izmir. Turkey has an embassy in Brussels and a consulate–general in Antwerp.

History 
Relations between the two countries started in 1837 with the recognition of independent Belgium by the Ottoman Empire. Diplomatic relations were established in 1848.

Political relations 
Turkey and Belgium are both members of the Council of Europe, the North Atlantic Treaty Organization (NATO), the Organisation for Economic Co-operation and Development (OECD), the Organization for Security and Co-operation in Europe (OSCE), the World Trade Organization (WTO) and the Union for the Mediterranean. Also Belgium is a European Union member and Turkey is a candidate.

The approximately 230,000 Turkish citizens living in Belgium constitute an important aspect in Turkey's relations with Belgium. They come predominantly from the Emirdağ district, located in Afyonkarahisar, Turkey.

In March 2019, the Turkish foreign ministry summoned the Belgian ambassador, Michel Malherbe, and relayed Turkey's unease after a Belgian court blocked the prosecution of some 30 people with alleged links to the Kurdistan Workers’ Party (PKK).

Belgium condemned the 2019 Turkish offensive into north-eastern Syria and called on Turkey to halt it immediately. The Belgian government later decided to implement an arms embargo against Turkey.

Economic relations 
Trade volume between Turkey and Belgium has increased remarkably over the years and reached € 3 billion. In 2006, Belgian exports to Turkey increased by 9,4% (€ 1,88 billion), whereas Turkish exports to Belgium increased 6,8% (€ 1,06 billion) comparing to 2005. Belgium is the seventeenth largest trade partner of Turkey.

The Turkish–Belgian Business Council, and organisations with similar aims, give priority to promoting commercial linkages. This council was established in 1990. Small and medium size businesses play an important role in the economies of Turkey and Belgium.

There are more than 200 Belgian firms operating in Turkey. The value of Belgian investments in Turkey is around € 300 million. On the other hand, the investment of Turkish companies in Belgium has exceeded € 1 billion.

In 2008, more than 583,409 Belgian tourists visited Turkey.

Visits

Embassies 
The Embassy of Belgium is located in Ankara, Turkey. The Embassy of Turkey is located in Brussels, Belgium.

See also 
 Foreign relations of Belgium
 Foreign relations of Turkey 
 Armenian genocide denial
 Turkey–European Union relations
 Turks in Belgium
 Turks in Europe

References

External links 
 Embassy of Turkey in Brussels
 Consulate–General of Turkey in Antwerp
 Embassy of Belgium in Turkey
 Diplomatic missions of Belgium in Turkey
 Diplomatic missions of Turkey in Belgium

 
Turkey
Bilateral relations of Turkey